Kajiado East is a constituency in Kenya. It is one of the five constituencies in Kajiado County. It is further subdivided into 5 county administrative wards namely Kitengela, Kenyawa-Poka, Imaroro, Kaputei North and Oloosirkon Sholinke Ward.

References 

Constituencies in Kajiado County